Youssef Maleh (born 22 August 1998) is an Italian-born Moroccan professional footballer who plays as a midfielder for  club Lecce on loan from Fiorentina.

Born in Italy to Moroccan parents, Maleh represented his native country internationally at under-21 level, before being called up to the Morocco national team in 2021.

Club career
Maleh began his career at Cesena and made his professional debut while on loan at Ravenna on 27 January 2018, in a Serie C 1–1 draw to Teramo. On 31 July 2018, he signed for Venezia and subsequently rejoined Ravenna on another loan for the 2018–19 season. 

On 21 January 2021, Fiorentina announced the signing of Maleh on a permanent deal, while also confirming that he would finish the 2020–21 season at Venezia. 

On 3 January 2023, Maleh joined Lecce on loan until the end of the season. Lecce will hold an obligation to buy his rights if the club remains in Serie A.

International career
Maleh was born in Italy and is of Moroccan descent. He made his debut with the Italy U21 on 3 September 2020, in a friendly match won 2–1 against Slovenia.

In August 2021, Maleh was first called-up to the Morocco national team for the 2022 FIFA World Cup qualification games against Sudan and Guinea in September.

Career statistics

References

External links
 
 

1998 births
Living people
People from Castel San Pietro Terme
Footballers from Emilia-Romagna
Italian people of Moroccan descent
Italian sportspeople of African descent
Sportspeople of Moroccan descent
Italian footballers
Moroccan footballers
Association football midfielders
A.C. Cesena players
Ravenna F.C. players
Venezia F.C. players
ACF Fiorentina players
U.S. Lecce players
Serie C players
Serie B players
Serie A players
Italy under-21 international footballers
Sportspeople from the Metropolitan City of Bologna